Crawford Constituency was a constituency in Singapore. It used to exist from 1959 to 1976, broke off from Rochore Constituency.

Member of Parliament
Kenneth Michael Byrne (1959 - 1963)
 S.T. Bani (1963 - 1966)
 Sellappa Ramaswamy (1966 - 1968)
Low Yong Nguan (1968 - 1972)
Ang Kok Peng (1972 - 1976)

Elections

Elections in 1950s

Elections in 1960s

References

Singaporean electoral divisions